Nancy L. Quarles (born July 13, 1951) is a Michigan politician.

Early life
Quarles was born on June 7, 1952.

Education
Quarles earned a B.S. in business administration from University of Detroit and an M.A. in public administrations from Central Michigan University. In 2001, earned a PhD in the public administration from Western Michigan University.

Career
Quarles served on the Oakland County Board of Commissioners from 1995 to 1996. On November 5, 1996, Quarles was elected to the Michigan House of Representatives where she represented the 36th district from January 8, 1997 to 2002. Quarles was again elected to the Oakland County Board of Commissioners in November 2010, and currently serves on this board. Quarles also currently works as a professor at Central Michigan University.

Personal life
Quarles resides in Southfield, Michigan and is married to Larry.

References

Living people
1952 births
People from Southfield, Michigan
Central Michigan University alumni
Western Michigan University alumni
County commissioners in Michigan
Central Michigan University faculty
Women state legislators in Michigan
African-American women in politics
African-American state legislators in Michigan
Democratic Party members of the Michigan House of Representatives
20th-century African-American women
20th-century African-American politicians
21st-century African-American women
21st-century African-American politicians
20th-century American women politicians
20th-century American politicians
21st-century American women politicians
21st-century American politicians
American women academics